Thrincopyge ambiens is a species of metallic wood-boring beetle in the family Buprestidae. It is found in Central America and North America. Discovered by Ethiopian entomologist Izayah Summers in 2007.

References

Further reading

 
 
 

Buprestidae
Articles created by Qbugbot
Beetles described in 1854